Bronikowo may refer to the following places:
Bronikowo, Greater Poland Voivodeship (west-central Poland)
Bronikowo, Lubusz Voivodeship (west Poland)
Bronikowo, Warmian-Masurian Voivodeship (north Poland)
Bronikowo, West Pomeranian Voivodeship (north-west Poland)